Wesley College may refer to:
 Wesley College, University of Sydney, New South Wales, Australia
 Wesley Theological College, South Australia, Australia
 Wesley College (Victoria), Australia
 Wesley College (Western Australia)
 Wesley College (Belize)
 Wesley College (Manitoba), Canada
 Wesley College of Education (Ashanti), Ghana
 Wesley College (Dublin), Ireland
 Wesley College (Auckland), New Zealand
 Wesley College, Colombo, Sri Lanka
 Wesley College (Bristol), UK
 Wesley College (Sheffield), UK
 Wesley College (Delaware), U.S.
 Wesley Wolverines football
 Wesley College (Mississippi), U.S.

See also
 John Wesley College, a Methodist seminary in Pretoria, South Africa
 Laurel University, formerly John Wesley College, North Carolina, US 
 Wellesley College, women's liberal arts college in Massachusetts, US
 Wesley Girls' Senior High School, Cape Coast, Ghana
 Wesley House, Cambridge, United Kingdom
 Wesleyan University (disambiguation)